OLAibi is a percussion-based experimental band from Osaka featuring members of OOIOO and Boredoms. Their sound has Okinawan influences and incorporates instruments like steel drums and pianica.

Discography
 Humming Moon Drip / ハミング・ムーン・ドリップ - (2006)
 Tingaruda / ティンガルーダ - (2009)
 New Rain / ニューレイン - (2012)
 Mi-mi wa wasu / みみはわす - (2017)

Personnel
 Ai
 Yoshimi P-We

External links
OLAibi home page

Japanese rock music groups
Musical groups from Osaka

Japanese women in electronic music